Wadena is a city in Otter Tail and Wadena counties in the State of Minnesota.  It is about one hundred sixty miles northwest of the Minneapolis – Saint Paul metro area. The population was 4,325 at the 2020 census.  It is the county seat of Wadena County.

Wadena is an agricultural community and serves as a region hub for the Tri county area. Wadena is located at the crossroads of Highway 10 and Highway 71. There is many small businesses in town with several large businesses in town. Some of those large employers include Tri County Health Care, Homecrest Outdoor Furniture, Mason Brothers Wholesale Grocery, Russ Davis Wholesale, Kern Laser Technology, Timber Roots Trussing, Ag Reliant, and Willis Rubber Company.

History
The first permanent settlement at Wadena was made in 1871. The city is named after Chief Wadena, an Ojibwe Indian chief of the late 19th century in northwestern Minnesota. A post office has been in operation at Wadena since 1873. Wadena was incorporated in 1881.  Four properties in Wadena are listed on the National Register of Historic Places: the Commercial Hotel built circa 1885, the Wadena Fire and City Hall built in 1912, the Northern Pacific Passenger Depot built in 1915, and the Peterson-Biddick Seed and Feed Company built 1916–1936.

2010 tornado

On June 17, 2010, Wadena was hit by an EF-4 tornado that cut a quarter-mile-wide path of destruction through the town. The Wadena tornado was part of the largest single day tornado outbreak in Minnesota state history, 48 tornados were recorded that day. The tornado that struck Wadena was over a mile wide at its peak, packed winds of up to 170 miles per hour, and was on the ground for about 10 miles. At least 232 homes were damaged in the city accounting for roughly 30% of homes in the city. Though no one in the town was killed, 34 people were treated for injuries at local hospitals. The Community Center was damaged "beyond repair", and the high school was also severely damaged. Both were later torn down and rebuilt. The city continues to recover with roughly 20 lots abandoned throughout the city. City officials are encouraging rebuilding by offering tax free land incentives. The Wadena Tornado was covered extensively on the December 1, 2010, episode of the Discovery Channel series Storm Chasers.

In the aftermath of the tornado, students from the high school attended classes at the Wadena campus of Minnesota State Community and Technical College, at a school that was previously no longer in use in nearby Deer Creek (Deer Creek having consolidated with Wadena in 1991), and at the Wadena Elementary School. In order to accommodate the high school students, some early childhood classes at the Elementary School were further moved to Saint Ann's Catholic School. Outdoor athletics were largely unaffected, but home volleyball and basketball games were played in the Elementary School gymnasium.

In fall of 2012, a brand new Middle-High School was opened with state of the art facilities and classrooms. In addition directly to the north of the high school, in the fall of 2014, a multimillion dollar Wellness Center was opened. The Maslowski Wellness and Research Center opened with a large aquatic center with a water slide, several multipurpose gymnasiums, a therapeutic pool, and a large workout facility.

Geography

U.S. Highways 10 and 71 and Minnesota State Highway 29 are three of the main routes in the city.

Demographics

2010 census
As of the census of 2010, there were 4,088 people, 1,840 households, and 1,013 families living in the city. The racial makeup of the city was 95.6% White, 1.6% African American, 0.3% Native American, 0.4% Asian, 0.2% from other races, and 1.8% from two or more races. Hispanic or Latino of any race were 1.4% of the population.

There were 1,840 households, of which 26.3% had children under the age of 18 living with them, 39.0% were married couples living together, 11.7% had a female householder with no husband present, 4.3% had a male householder with no wife present, and 44.9% were non-families. 40.2% of all households were made up of individuals, and 20.1% had someone living alone who was 65 years of age or older. The average household size was 2.14 and the average family size was 2.86.

The median age in the city was 42 years. 22.1% of residents were under the age of 18; 9.5% were between the ages of 18 and 24; 21% were from 25 to 44; 24.3% were from 45 to 64; and 23% were 65 years of age or older. The gender makeup of the city was 47.3% male and 52.7% female.

2000 census
As of the census of 2000, there were 4,294 people, 1,871 households, and 1,062 families living in the city. The racial makeup of the city was 97.88% White, 0.84% African American, 0.28% Native American, 0.19% Asian, 0.02% Pacific Islander, 0.16% from other races, and 0.63% from two or more races. Hispanic or Latino of any race were 0.61% of the population.

There were 1,871 households, out of which 25.4% had children under the age of 18 living with them, 44.6% were married couples living together, 9.2% had a female householder with no husband present, and 43.2% were non-families. 37.8% of all households were made up of individuals, and 20.3% had someone living alone who was 65 years of age or older.  The average household size was 2.20 and the average family size was 2.92.

In the city, the population was spread out, with 23.4% under the age of 18, 10.2% from 18 to 24, 22.1% from 25 to 44, 20.2% from 45 to 64, and 24.1% who were 65 years of age or older.  The median age was 41 years. For every 100 females, there were 90.9 males.  For every 100 females age 18 and over, there were 84.7 males.

The median income for a household in the city was $26,947, and the median income for a family was $39,511. Males had a median income of $28,286 versus $21,297 for females. The per capita income for the city was $15,452.  About 10.3% of families and 15.6% of the population were below the poverty line, including 15.9% of those under age 18 and 13.4% of those age 65 or over.

Media

Radio stations
FM radio
92.5 KXKK
94.5 KDLB
97.5 KDKK
94.7 KSKK
101.9 KQKK
102.5 KKWB-FM
105.9 KKWS

AM radio
820 WBKK-AM
870 KPRM Classic Country
920 KWAD Classic Country
1070 KSKK Variety
1430 KNSP Classic Country
1570 KAKK

Television
Wadena is served by 3 local TV stations:
 KCCW Ch. 12 CBS (Walker)
 KAWB Ch. 22 PBS (Brainerd)
 KSAX Ch. 42 ABC (Alexandria)

The local cable TV providers are Spectrum Cable and Arvig Communications.

Newspapers
Wadena Pioneer Journal

Arts and culture
With over 100 hand-painted murals decorating downtown buildings, Wadena depicts 1,000 years of Minnesota history known as the "Largest Puzzle in the World". The Alley Arts Committee beautified the alleys while creating an interesting tourist attraction. Over 40 artists worked together to finish the collection of 100 puzzle panels. Group guided tours are available along with a map at the train depot.

During the 2015 Christmas season, Wisconsin-based group Freedom From Religion threatened legal action against the city of Wadena over the display of a city-owned nativity in a city park.  To avoid a lawsuit, the city sold the nativity to a private buyer who was able to feature it in an even more prominent, privately owned location.  As a result of the actions of the Freedom From Religion, many nativity scenes sprang up around the city, estimated to be over 1,000 in total.  The former site of the city-owned nativity was rented out a day at a time by individuals who were legally able to display a nativity.  The story captured the attention of national media outlets.

Wadena is home to the Cozy Theatre, which in addition to showing contemporary films, hosts a film festival.

Notable residents
Don A. Anderson, businessman and Minnesota state legislator
Ernest P. Anderson, businessman and Minnesota state legislator
Frank C. Mars, founder of Mars, Incorporated, was born in Hancock, Minnesota but lived in Wadena around the time of his son Forrest's birth in 1904.
Forrest Mars Sr., son of Frank C. Mars and eventual owner of Mars, Incorporated and M&M's, was born in Wadena but moved away as a child.

Images

References

External links

City Website

Cities in Otter Tail County, Minnesota
Cities in Wadena County, Minnesota
Cities in Minnesota
County seats in Minnesota